Ajit Rai is an Indian film and theatre critic and cultural journalist. He is associated with Jansatta and The Indian Express.

Early life 
Rai was born in Kasian village in Buxar district of Bihar.

Works 
He has served as the editor of Rang Prasang, journal of National School of Drama, Ministry of Culture Government of India, New Delhi. Over the years he has been covering various International Film Festivals like Cannes International Film Festival, El Gouna Film Festival, and Cairo International Film Festival. He is the director of Raipur Film Festival, Azamgarh Film Festival and Haryana International Film Festival. He is also the member of International Farmer Film Festival and festival coordinator of the Media International Film Festival. He is also a member of the selection committee for the Meta Awards.

References 

Indian critics
Living people
Indian film critics
People from Bihar
Year of birth missing (living people)